The National Automotive Parts Association (NAPA), also known as NAPA Auto Parts, founded in 1925, is an American retailers' cooperative distributing automotive replacement parts, accessories and service items throughout North America.

Operations 

There are over 6,000 NAPA Auto Parts stores in the United States. 1,142 NAPA stores are owned by Genuine Parts Company, and the remainder are independently owned. 15,000 NAPA AutoCare repair facilities are in operation which provide vehicle maintenance and repair services.

Outside the United States, NAPA operates in Canada through the UAP (United Auto Parts) division of Genuine Parts Company and NAPA Autopro repair facilities in Canada, Mexico and other locations throughout the Caribbean and Latin America.

In April 2013, Genuine Parts Company acquired Exego Group, a leading automotive parts and accessories distributor in Australasia.  The company sells automotive accessories and parts under the Repco name in Australia and New Zealand, but in 2017 began branding with the NAPA banner, first with a store in Logan City, Queensland, and since re-branding their Ashdown Ingram stores Australia wide, to fall under the Napa Auto Parts banner as well.

In September 2017, Genuine Parts Company acquired Alliance Automotive Group (AAG), a leading European distributor of vehicle parts, tools and workshop equipment.  AAG is the second largest parts distribution platform in Europe and focuses on light vehicle and commercial vehicle replacement parts. Headquartered in London, AAG has 7,500 employees and over 1,800 company-owned stores and affiliated outlets across France, the U.K. and Germany.

Products and services 

NAPA carries over 500,000 items, including automotive replacement parts, paint and refinishing supplies, automotive accessories, farm and marine supplies, tools and equipment, and heavy duty parts. NAPA also operates a parts repackaging company known as Balkamp.

Sponsorships

Motorsports

NAPA currently sponsors the No. 9 Chevrolet Camaro of Chase Elliott and Hendrick Motorsports in the NASCAR Cup Series. The company sponsored the No. 56 Toyota Camry driven in the Cup Series by Martin Truex Jr. for Michael Waltrip Racing up to 2013 and also sponsored Michael Waltrip from 2001 to 2009 when he drove for Dale Earnhardt, Inc., Bill Davis Racing, and his own team. All four of Waltrip's wins were with NAPA as his sponsor, including the 2001 and 2003 Daytona 500's. NAPA also sponsored Truex's brother Ryan in the K&N Pro Series East and was the sponsor for multi-time champion driver Kelly Moore in the same series. NAPA dropped its sponsorship of MWR after a major scandal during the 2013 Federated Auto Parts 400. In 2014, NAPA began sponsoring JR Motorsports' Chase Elliott in the Xfinity Series. In May 2015, NAPA announced it would become the majority sponsor of Elliott and the No. 24 Chevrolet team in the Cup Series with Hendrick in 2016.

NAPA also sponsors the Schumacher Racing Dodge Charger Funny Car driven by Ron Capps in the NHRA Mello Yello Drag Racing Series; Brandon McReynolds, driver of the No. 16 Toyota, owned by Bill McAnally Racing in the K&N Pro Series West; and Nick Drake, driver of the BMR's No. 15 Toyota in the Pro Series East.

In May 2016, Balkamp, a subsidiary of NAPA, became a primary sponsor of Alexander Rossi, a driver for Andretti Autosport in the IndyCar Series, on a one-race sponsorship for the Indianapolis 500. In the 2016 Indianapolis 500, Rossi would win the race on a fuel mileage run. Balkamp, being a subsidiary of NAPA, used the NAPA Auto Parts logos on the car. The deal was extended for the Detroit doubleheader but then dropped thereafter. NAPA returned to sponsor Rossi for the 2017 season on a seven-race schedule including the 2017 Indianapolis 500.

NAPA Auto Super Store in Logan City, Queensland sponsors Erebus Racing, which won the 2017 Supercheap Auto Bathurst 1000.

In February 2020, NAPA and Hendrick Motorsports announced an extension of their sponsorship deal through the 2022 Cup Series season. NAPA will be the primary sponsor of Chase Elliott‘s No. 9 Chevrolet in 26 races each season.

Other
NAPA is a sponsor of the Atlanta Braves, Atlanta Falcons, Atlanta United,  and the Mexico national football team.
NAPA is also a sponsor of Play of the game on SEC on CBS Broadcast. They sponsored ArenaBowl XXIII as well.

See also

 Advance Auto Parts
 CarParts.com
 Carquest
 O'Reilly Auto Parts
 Pep Boys
 Certified Automotive Parts Association

References 

Automotive part retailers of the United States
American companies established in 1925
Retail companies established in 1925
Retailers' cooperatives in the United States
1925 establishments in Georgia (U.S. state)
Companies based in Atlanta